About a Mile are an American Christian music band with three members, all brothers, from Butler, Pennsylvania. The band started making music in 2009. Word Records signed the band in 2016 and released their first album: About a Mile.

Background
About a Mile is a Christian band from Butler, Pennsylvania.

The band's name originates from the belief that Jesus carried his cross "about a mile". The band has been included on Winter Jam and have toured with Sidewalk Prophets, DecembeRadio and more.

The band consists of brothers Adam, Luke and Levi Klutinoty, who released their self-titled album on July 15, 2014. The recording quickly launched onto the retail charts to become 2014's biggest selling Christian album debut from a new artist.

 Adam Klute (Adam Daniel Klutinoty) – guitar, lead vocals
 Levi Klute (Levi James Paul Klutinoty) – drums
 Luke Klute (Luke Aaron Klutinoty) – bass

Discography

References

Word Records artists